Eastern Kamchadal, also known as Eastern Itelmen (or Northern, Northeastern of the same) is an extinct Kamchatkan language of Russia.

References

Chukotko-Kamchatkan languages
Extinct languages of Asia